Democratic National Union of Kurdistan or Kurdistan National Democratic Union (Kurdish: Yekitiya Netewayî Demokratî Kurdistan)  (YNDK) is a political party that is based in South Kurdistan. Its main goal is to establish independence for the greater Kurdistan. It was founded in 1996 by Ghafur Makhmuri. The party was part of the Kurdistani List in the 2005 elections and received 1 seat in the Kurdistani parliament.

External links
YNDK Official site

Kurdish nationalism in Iraq
Kurdish organisations
Regionalist parties
Kurdish nationalist political parties
Kurdish political parties in Iraq
Political parties in Kurdistan Region